William H. Reams (born May 7, 1933) was an American politician who served as a member of the King County Council from 1969 to 1990. A member of the Republican Party, he represented the 3rd district.

References 

Living people
King County Councillors
Republican Party members of the Washington House of Representatives
1933 births